The Cowichan River  is a Canadian Heritage River on Vancouver Island, in British Columbia, Canada. Its headwater is Cowichan Lake. The river flows east over Skutz Falls and through Marie Canyon towards its mouth at Cowichan Bay.

The Cowichan River is the centre of a provincial park, Cowichan River Provincial Park, on southern Vancouver Island. The park is home to hundreds of animal species, including the native and endangered Vancouver Island ermine and more than 200 species of birds.

The river is the namesake of Cowichan Herald Extraordinary at the Canadian Heraldic Authority. 

In the decade leading up to 2014, water levels dropped to the point that it "required the trucking of fish up the river," and the Cowichan Valley Regional District instituted water restrictions for residents.

Water from the river is used in the pulp and paper mill operated by Catalyst Paper in Crofton.

See also
 Cowichan Valley
 Cowichan Tribes
 Lake Cowichan, a settlement at the origin of the Cowichan River

References

Rivers of Vancouver Island
Southern Vancouver Island
Cowichan Valley